Soviet Union women's national bandy team represented the former Soviet Union in bandy. It was controlled by the Federation of bandy and field hockey USSR.

The Soviet women did not form a national team until around 1990. In 1990 and 1991 they were in Sweden playing the Swedish women's team.

See also
Bandy
Rink bandy
Women's Bandy World Championship
Great Britain women's national bandy team
Sweden women's national bandy team
Russia women's national bandy team
Finland women's national bandy team
Norway women's national bandy team
Switzerland women's national bandy team
China women's national bandy team
Canada women's national bandy team
Hungary women's national bandy team
United States women's national bandy team

References

National bandy teams
Bandy
Bandy in the Soviet Union